The Frauenthal & Schwarz Building, also known as the Front Street Mall. is a historic commercial building at 824 Front Street in Conway, Arkansas.  It was designed by architects Sanders & Ginocchio and built in 1925 as a major expansion and renovation of an 1879 building.  It is a two-story structure, built of brick, steel, and concrete.  Its ground floor storefront consists of plate glass windows and two double-leaf doorways, sheltered by a flat metal overhang.  The upper floor has four groups of six windows, each consisting of larger-paned sections topped by smaller-paned ones.  A decorative cornice with Mediterranean touches and flattened Italianate brackets extends above them.  The building is one of the city's architecturally finest surviving commercial structures of the 1920s, designed by a prominent firm.

The building was listed on the U.S. National Register of Historic Places in 1992.

See also
Frauenthal House (Conway, Arkansas), also designed by Charles L. Thompson and related firms and NRHP-listed

References

Commercial buildings on the National Register of Historic Places in Arkansas
Chicago school architecture in the United States
Buildings and structures completed in 1925
Buildings and structures in Conway, Arkansas
National Register of Historic Places in Faulkner County, Arkansas
Historic district contributing properties in Arkansas